The Cocle salamander (Bolitoglossa schizodactyla), also known as the Cocle mushroomtongue salamander, is a species of salamander in the family Plethodontidae. It is found in Costa Rica and Panama. In Costa Rica, it is only known from the southeastern part of the country on the Atlantic versant, whereas in Panama it is more widespread and occurs also on the Pacific versant.
Its natural habitats are humid lowland and montane forests. It is a common species in Panama, whereas it is only known from a single specimen in Costa Rica. It is threatened by habitat loss.

References

Bolitoglossa
Amphibians of Costa Rica
Amphibians of Panama
Amphibians described in 1966
Taxa named by David B. Wake
Taxonomy articles created by Polbot